Defending champions Martina Navratilova and Pam Shriver defeated Claudia Kohde-Kilsch and Helena Suková in the final, 6–2, 7–5 to win the women's doubles tennis title at the 1988 French Open. It was Navratilova's fifth straight French Open title in women's doubles.

Seeds

Draw

Finals

Top half

Section 1

Section 2

Bottom half

Section 3

Section 4

References
1988 French Open – Women's draws and results at the International Tennis Federation

Women's Doubles
French Open by year – Women's doubles
1988 in women's tennis
1988 in French women's sport